Matachia is a genus of South Pacific intertidal spiders that was first described by R. de Dalmas in 1917. Originally placed with the Psechridae, it was moved to the intertidal spiders in 1970.

Species
 it contains five species, all found in New Zealand:
Matachia australis Forster, 1970 – New Zealand
Matachia livor (Urquhart, 1893) – New Zealand
Matachia marplesi Forster, 1970 – New Zealand
Matachia ramulicola Dalmas, 1917 (type) – New Zealand
Matachia similis Forster, 1970 – New Zealand

References

Araneomorphae genera
Desidae
Spiders of New Zealand